This is a list of Danish sweets and desserts. The cuisine of Denmark refers to food preparation originating from Denmark or having played a significant part in the history of Danish cuisine. Denmark also shares many dishes and influences with surrounding Nordic countries, such as Sweden, Finland, and Norway.

Characteristics
Danish desserts are heavily inspired by other desserts, cultures, and bakers throughout Europe. Specifically, the famous Danish pastry wienerbrød was first developed by Austrian bakers who immigrated to Denmark during a worker's strike. Other European desserts, such as profiteroles and riz à l'impératrice, have inspired the development of Danish desserts.

Frequently used ingredients include butter, sugar, various flours, dried fruit, nuts, chocolate, and different spices. Characterized by its cold climate, Denmark features desserts consisting of fruits that can survive the long, frigid winters, such as apples, redcurrants, cherries, cloudberries, and plums.

Danish desserts

Gallery

See also
 Danish cuisine
 List of desserts

References

Danish desserts